Patrick Nuku Granue (born March 1, 1975) is a Liberian former footballer who played as a defender.

External links 
 

1975 births
Living people
Liberian footballers
Association football defenders
Sportspeople from Monrovia
Liberia international footballers